Satkania Government College is an educational institution of Bangladesh. It is the only one government college of Satkania Upazila.

Location 
Satkania Government College is situated in the Chittagong District at Satkania Upazila.

History 
It was established in 1949 by Mozaffar Ahmed Chowdhury. In 1982 it runs as government college.

Academic works 
At present the institution offer to study Higher Secondary education class 11–12. Bedside this, it has degree course under National University of Bangladesh. Recently the institution starts undergraduate honours course under National University of Bangladesh.

Student 
There are 4000+ students study in the institution.

Infrastructure 
The institution has an administrative building, it has six academic buildings. For the students, the institution has a playground.

Management 
The institution has a managing committee, who are conduct the institution.

Library 
The institution has a Library.

Department and faculty  
The institution currently offer three department for Higher Secondary students. These are Science, Arts and Commerce.
And also the institution has following faculties 
 Physics
 Chemistry  
 Mathematics 
 Zoology
 Botany
 Bengali 
 English 
 Philosophy
 Economics
 Information and Communication Technology (ICT)      
 Accounting
 Management 
 Political Science 
 History 
 Islamic history and culture.

Co Curriculum Activity 
The institution has following cor curriculum activist:
 Rover Scout
 BNCC
 Red Crescent
 Debate Club

Notable alumni
 Bimal Guha – writer and poet. Professor of University of Dhaka

See also
 Mirzakhil High School

References 

Colleges in Chittagong
Educational institutions established in 1949
Satkania Upazila
1950 establishments in East Pakistan